Sakhorn Khanthasit is a Thai wheelchair tennis player.

Khanthasit competed at the 2004 Paralympic Games where she won a silver medal in the women's doubles event. She also competed at the 2012 Paralympic Games.

References

Year of birth missing (living people)
Living people
Sakhorn Khanthasit
Sakhorn Khanthasit
Sakhorn Khanthasit
Wheelchair tennis players at the 2004 Summer Paralympics
Wheelchair tennis players at the 2012 Summer Paralympics
Medalists at the 2004 Summer Paralympics
Paralympic medalists in wheelchair tennis
Sakhorn Khanthasit